M. A. Jabbar (15 February 1940 – 7 April 2020) is a Jatiya Party (Ershad) politician and the former Member of Parliament of Satkhira-2.

Career
Jabbar was elected to parliament from Satkhira-2 as a Jatiya Party candidate in 2008. In 2015, he was sued by the Anti Corruption Commission. He died on 7 April 2020.

References

Jatiya Party politicians
People from Satkhira District
9th Jatiya Sangsad members
2020 deaths
1940 births